Richard Howard Morgan (12 August 195823 December 2006) was an Australian actor. He was most famous for playing the long-running role of Terry Sullivan in the Australian television series The Sullivans.

Early career 
After watching a film crew shooting a scene from a television series in his streetand observing the average performance of a child actor similar to his own ageMorgan decided that "he could do better than that" and got himself an acting agent and started going for auditions.

His professional career began when he was cast in guest roles in Crawford Productions television series Homicide (in 1975) and Solo One (1976).

After roles in the motion pictures The Devil's Playground and Break of Day (both 1976), Morgan became one of the original cast members of the hit television series The Sullivans, produced by Crawford Productions.  Morgan played Terry Sullivan, the third and youngest Sullivan son. A scampish schoolboy at the beginning of the series, as he matured he harboured dreams of joining the air force, however inner-ear problems prevented this and he instead joined the army. He later married Caroline, however the war took a greater psychological toll on Terry than his brothers, and he struggled both with his marriage and his readjustment to civilian life. Terry was indirectly responsible for the death of his father Dave at the conclusion of the series.

Although the show contained soap-staple storylines, the war backdrop allowed for more serious moments than normally seen in Aussie soaps. It screened on Australian television from 1976 to 1983.

After the series ended, other motion picture roles followed, including the hit Phar Lap (1983) about the racehorse of the same name, and in Innocent Prey and Silver City (both 1984). He also appeared in the television film The Wicked, opposite Brett Climo, in 1987.

After this came a role in the Sydney-based television series Sons and Daughters in 1984, and guest roles in drama series like A Country Practice (1987), Home and Away (1989) and female cop drama Skirts (1990).

During this period he also acted in television movies and miniseries including D.H. Lawrence's The Boy in the Bush (1984 miniseries starring Kenneth Branagh and Sigrid Thornton); Great Expectations: The Untold Story (1986 telemovie directed by Tim Burstall) and The Charmer (1987 miniseries starring Nigel Havers).

He featured as 'Stretch' Lewis in the 1989 US picture Farewell to the King directed by John Milius, starring alongside Nick Nolte, James Fox and Nigel Havers.

Later life 
After a break of a number of yearswhen he got heavily involved in the booming computer businessMorgan returned to acting with guest roles in Australian television series such as Neighbours in 2000, Blue Heelers in 2000, Something in the Air in 2000, and the ABC-TV series MDA in 2002.

He gained a new generation of fans when he joined the cast of the popular Nine Network undercover cop series Stingers, where he played the recurring role of Reg 'The Ferret' Masters from 1999-2004.

Death  
In 2005 Morgan was diagnosed with motor neuron disease (MND / ALS) and died from the illness eighteen months later.

He was survived by his wife Lisa and daughters Ella and Zoe.

References

External links

Australian male television actors
Male actors from Hobart
1958 births
2006 deaths
Neurological disease deaths in Victoria (Australia)
Deaths from motor neuron disease